Maidelis Saldiña (born 1988) is a team handball goalkeeper from Cuba. She plays on the Cuba women's national handball team, and participated at the 2011 World Women's Handball Championship in Brazil.

References

1988 births
Living people
Cuban female handball players
21st-century Cuban women